José Ignacio Valenzuela (born April 29, 1972, Santiago de Chile, Chile) also known by the nickname Chascas, is a Chilean writer and screenwriter. Author of scripts for national and foreign soap operas, among which Amor a domicilio, La familia de al lado, Dama y obrero and adaptation of Lola—, He has also participated in the development of various television, literature, film and theater projects in Chile, Mexico, United States and Puerto Rico. He has published a number of novels and short fiction, and has also served as professor and instructor of creative writing.

Personal life 
Son of José Miguel Valenzuela Fuentes and Cecilia Violeta Güiraldes Camerati, born in the neighborhood of Las Condes in Santiago de Chile. Nephew of renowned children's author Chilean Ana María Güiraldes, whom he accompanied in 1992 for co-writing program at the National Television Arboliris Chile. He lived 8 years in Puerto Rico, 2 years in New York and nearly 10 years in Mexico. He currently resides in Miami, United States.

Filmography

Awards and nominations

References

External links 

Chilean screenwriters
1972 births
Living people
Chilean gay writers
Chilean LGBT screenwriters
Gay screenwriters